Reggio may refer to:

Places
 Reggio Calabria, in southern Italy
 Province of Reggio Calabria
 Reggio Emilia, in northern Italy
 Province of Reggio Emilia
 Reggio, Louisiana, in United States of America

People
 Arturo Reggio (1863–1917), Italian chess player
 Godfrey Reggio (born 1940), American film director
 Isaac Samuel Reggio (1784–1855), Austro-Italian scholar and rabbi

See also
 Reggio Emilia approach, an educational philosophy